This is a list of years in Burundi.

20th century

21st century

 
Burundi history-related lists
Burundi